Heiko Butscher (born 28 July 1980) is a German former professional footballer who played as a centre back. He is the current under-19 head coach of VfL Bochum.

Career
Butscher joined Eintracht Frankfurt from SC Freiburg in 2012. He previously played for VfL Bochum, VfB Stuttgart II and Karlsruher SC.

Post-playing career
In summer 2015 Butscher was appointed assistant coach of VfL Bochum's U16 team.

Career statistics

Club

Managerial statistics

References

External links

1980 births
Living people
People from Leutkirch im Allgäu
Sportspeople from Tübingen (region)
Association football defenders
German footballers
Footballers from Baden-Württemberg
Karlsruher SC II players
Karlsruher SC players
VfB Stuttgart players
VfB Stuttgart II players
VfL Bochum players
VfL Bochum II players
SC Freiburg players
SV Sandhausen players
Eintracht Frankfurt players
Bundesliga players
2. Bundesliga players
Regionalliga players
VfL Bochum managers
Bundesliga managers
2. Bundesliga managers
German football managers
VfL Bochum non-playing staff